Roderick Bell (October 6, 1947 - March 29, 2014) was a Canadian diplomat.

In 1976 he was Second Secretary next the Headquarters of the United Nations.

In 1995 he was acting director Federation Ombudsmen of the Organization for Security and Co-operation in Europe.
From 1997 to 2000 he was director of the unit "United Nations & Commonwealth Affairs. 
From 2003 to 2007 he was Ambassador Extraordinary and Plenipotentiary to Saudi Arabia with concurrent accreditation to the Arab Republic of Yemen, Bahrain and Oman. From 2000 to 2003 he was Ambassador Extraordinary and Plenipotentiary to JordanAmbassador Roderick L. Bell. (Also covers Iraq.) .

References

External links 
 Foreign Affairs and International Trade Canada Complete List of Posts

Ambassadors of Canada to Jordan
Ambassadors of Canada to Saudi Arabia
Ambassadors of Canada to Yemen
Ambassadors of Canada to Bahrain
Ambassadors of Canada to Oman
1947 births
2014 deaths